Kalmyk Americans are Americans of Kalmyk Mongolian ancestry.  

American Kalmyks initially established communities in the United States following a mass immigration after World War II.  The largest groups of Kalmyks originally settled primarily in the states of Pennsylvania and New Jersey. The majority of today's Kalmyk American population are descended from those Kalmyks who had fled Russia in late 1920 to places such as France, Yugoslavia, Bulgaria, and, later, Germany. 

As a consequence of their decades-long migration through Europe, many original immigrant Kalmyk Americans could speak German, French, and Serbo-Croatian, in addition to Russian and their native Kalmyk language.

Many Kalmyks were stranded in German displaced persons camps for a number of years following the end of World War II. They were originally classified as Asian under U.S. immigration law, and therefore denied entry, but in 1951 they were reclassified as Caucasian. In 1955 many immigrated to the United States after the Tolstoy Foundation sponsored their passage.

There are several Kalmyk Buddhist temples in Monmouth County, New Jersey, (notably Freewood Acres, New Jersey) where the vast majority of American Kalmyks reside, as well as a Tibetan Buddhist Learning Center and monastery in Washington Township, New Jersey.

Notable people 
 Sandje Ivanchukov
 Erdne Ombadykow
 Ngawang Wangyal

See also
 Kalmyks
 Kalmykia
 Mongol Americans

References

External links
Map Collection of the Library of Congress: "Carte de Tartarie" of Guillaume de L'Isle (1675-1726) ; shows territories of Kalmyks as in 1706.
Kalmyk Mongolian Buddhist Center, Howell, New Jersey
Tashi Lhunpo Temple, a Kalmyk Buddhist temple in Howell, New Jersey

 
European-American society
Ethnic groups in the United States
Kalmyk diaspora